Edwin Earl Ellis (August 28, 1924 - April 2, 1989) was an American inventor and photographer.

Life
He served in the U.S. Navy from 1943 to 1949 as a photographer. During this time he participated in the landings at the Battle of Okinawa. Most notably, he was a photographer on Operation Highjump, becoming one of the first people to visually document Antarctica.  The Ellis Fjord and the Ellis Glacier are named after him. After the South Pole, he went to Norfolk, and was part of the crew that commissioned the USS Coral Sea (CV-43).  He was also the founder of the Ellis Trailer Park in Paducah.  The land it sat on is now owned by Cardinal Lanes.

Inventor
As an inventor he holds a patent for an awning support system.

Personal life
On August 16, 1947, he married Stella Beatrice Ellis (née) Irby.  The couple had their first child, Edwin "Ed" Earl Ellis, Jr., on May 25, 1954.  Two other children followed:  Linda Elaine Johnson (née) Ellis on July 13, 1959 and Donald Wayne Ellis on August 5, 1960.

He died April 2, 1989 in Paducah, Kentucky

References 

1924 births
1989 deaths
20th-century American photographers
20th-century American inventors
United States Navy personnel of World War II